Salkind may refer to:
Alexander Salkind (1921–1997), European film producer
Alvin J. Salkind (1927–2015), American chemical engineer
Ilya Salkind (born 1947), Mexican film and television producer
Morton Salkind (1932–2014), American politician
Mischa Salkind-Pearl, American composer, keyboardist and educator

See also
Salkin